A cock ring or cockring (also called a C ring, erection ring, penis ring, shaft ring, tension ring, or Arab strap) is a ring worn around the penis, usually at the base. The primary purpose of wearing a cock ring is to restrict the flow of blood from the erect penis to produce a stronger erection or to maintain an erection for a longer period of time. Genital adornment is another purpose, as is repositioning the genitals to provide an enhanced appearance.

Cock rings are also called C rings, penis rings or shaft rings. When used in cases of erectile dysfunction (ED), they are known by various other names, such as erection rings and tension rings.

Cock rings worn just behind the corona of the glans of the penis are known as glans rings, head rings or cock crowns. A ring that is worn around the penis and scrotum is also usually called a cock ring, but is sometimes referred to as a cock and ball ring. Rings that are worn just around the scrotum, in order to hold the testicles, are usually called testicle cuffs or ball stretchers.

Motivations

Medical
An erection ring may be worn to treat erectile dysfunction (ED). When used for ED, a purpose-designed vacuum pump is used to produce an erection by simple mechanical and hydrodynamical action in spite of vascular or nerve damage, and the ring is slid off the pump's cylinder onto the base of the penis to maintain the erection before it is lost. The testicles are not ringed in this case.

Recreational
A cock ring may be used during sex or masturbation to prolong or enhance erections, delay orgasm, or for the sensation of tightness and engorgement that wearing one produces; vibrating models apply vibration to the base of the user's penis and to their partner. They can be worn as sex toys or for aesthetic reasons.

Use
The purpose of a cock ring is to trap blood inside the penis in order to maintain an erection, or encourage a stronger erection. In order to do this, it must be placed at the base of the penis.

A ring made of stretchy material is simply stretched over the penis (and optionally also the scrotum, except when used with a pump for impotence) and situated against the body. Rigid rings are used differently: first each testicle is fed through the ring and the entire scrotum is pulled through, then the flaccid penis is pushed through the ring and the ring is situated against the body.
When used with a pump, a lubricating gel is always used to help the pump maintain a vacuum, in the same way vacuum grease is used with a vacuum pump in scientific applications. The gel also makes it easier for the ring to slide off the pump, and later, to remove it from the penis.

Variations
Some models include a protruding clitoral stimulator, designed to tickle the clitoris, vulva, or anus during sex (and during masturbation while the ring is used on a dildo). Others, such as the vibrating ring, vibrate, either vibrating the ring itself, or using two removable bullet vibrators to provide stimulation to the testicles and clitoris. Some cock rings have vibrators attached that can be worn to stimulate the scrotum or perineum of a partner during sexual intercourse. Many women find that rings with vibrator attachments provide clitoral stimulation that is needed for achieving orgasm.

Another variation is an inflatable cock ring for added control of adjustment.

A triple cock ring or triple crown is a cock ring that has additional rings for restraining the testicles. In orgasm, the testicles usually retract towards the body before ejaculation. A triple crown changes and intensifies the sensation of orgasm by forcing the testicles to stay away from the body.

Risks
Vendors of cock rings and medical sources indicate that cock rings are not to be worn for more than about 30 minutes. Falling asleep or using illicit drugs at the same time is very dangerous. The first sign of pending problems is when the penis starts to become numb, painful, or cold. As soon as this happens, the cock ring must be removed.

Medical issues
Cock rings that are too tight, or worn for too long can be dangerous: this may cause priapism, a medical emergency that, if not treated promptly, can result in severe and permanent damage, including penile gangrene that can result in the destruction and possible amputation of the penis. Rings for erectile dysfunction are invariably supplied with the instruction that they should not be left on for more than thirty minutes. Falling asleep with a ring on is a particular danger. This may lead to temporary or permanent nerve damage. Numbness in the glans penis, penis becoming cold or penis becoming white may be signs that a cock ring has been worn for too long and medical advice should be sought.

Cock rings must not be used without medical advice by those who have cardiovascular problems or who take blood-thinning medication.

Materials and types
Commercially available cock rings are made from many different materials, including: leather, rubber, silicone, neoprene, nylon, metals (including: aluminium, steel, titanium, silver, gold and platinum), wood, plastic, bone, horn, ceramic, glass, and semi precious stone.

Designs range from the simple to the complex. Simple rings may lie flat on a surface, while others are ergonomically curved to fit more comfortably on the wearer. Some designs are horseshoe shaped with a closure. In cross section, the rings may vary from round to flattened oval, the latter offering more friction on the penis and are therefore less likely to slip. Many of the newer rings also have different accessories and projections.

There are also vibrating cock rings available which can stimulate the testes at the same time.

Today, cock rings can be bought with accessories that stimulate the clitoris or anal area during intercourse. Other cock rings go around the scrotum and can significantly enhance erection and intensity of orgasms.

However, there is one disadvantage: the more accessories that are added on, the greater the chance of developing discomfort or cold sensations from the device.

Rings for ED must be able to be placed in position while a pump is connected; the erection is lost as soon as vacuum is removed unless the ring is already in place. This rules out most types other than simple elastic rings.

Specialized underwear
Specialized underwear is available which comes with pre-fitted cock rings. The underwear has a pouch with an internal fabric/elastic cock ring which either slides along the penis and encircles the scrotum or, alternatively, simply snaps around the base of the scrotum to snugly—but not in a constricting way—attach the pouch to the genitals. While this type of pouch permits the wearer to "go backless", C ring pouches can be attached to either a thong or traditional jockstrap.

See also 
 Bondage cuffs
 Cock and ball torture
 Elastration

References

External links
 

Male sex toys
Rings (jewellery)